Tiger Lake is Intel's codename for the 11th generation Intel Core mobile processors based on the new Willow Cove Core microarchitecture, manufactured using Intel's third-generation 10 nm process node known as 10SF ("10 nm SuperFin"). Tiger Lake replaces the Ice Lake family of mobile processors, representing an Optimization step in Intel's process–architecture–optimization model.

Tiger Lake processors launched on September 2, 2020, are part of the Tiger Lake-U family and include dual-core and quad-core 9 W (7–15 W) TDP and 15 W (12–28 W) TDP models. They power 2020 "Project Athena" laptops. The quad-core 96 EU die measures 13.6 × 10.7 mm (146.1 mm2), which is 19.2% wider than the 11.4 × 10.7 mm (122.5 mm2) quad-core 64 EU Ice Lake die. The 8-core 32 EU die used in Tiger Lake-H is around 190 mm2. According to Yehuda Nissan and his team, the architecture is named after a lake across Puget Sound, Washington from Seattle. Laptops based on Tiger Lake started to sell in October 2020.

The Tiger Lake-H35 processors were launched on January 11, 2021. These quad-core processors are designed for "ultraportable gaming" laptops with 28-35 W TDP. Intel also announced that the Tiger Lake-H processors with 45 W TDP and up to eight cores will become available in Q1 2021. Intel officially launched 11th Gen Intel Core-H series on May 11, 2021 and announced 11th Gen Intel Core Tiger Lake Refresh series on May 30, 2021.

Features

CPU

 Intel Willow Cove CPU cores
 Full memory (RAM) encryption
 Indirect branch tracking and CET shadow stack
 Intel Key Locker

GPU
 Intel Xe-LP ("Gen12") GPU with up to 96 execution units (50% uplift compared to Ice Lake, up from 64) with some yet to be announced processors using Intel's discrete GPU, DG1
 Fixed-function hardware decoding for HEVC 12-bit, 4:2:2/4:4:4; VP9 12-bit 4:4:4 and AV1 8K 10-bit 4:2:0
 Support for a single 8K 12-bit HDR display or two 4K 10-bit HDR displays
 Hardware accelerated Dolby Vision
 Sampler Feedback support
 Dual Queue Support

IPU
 Image Processing Unit, a special co-processor to improve image and video capture quality
 Not available on embedded models
 Initially there were 1165G7, 1135G7, 1125G4 and 1115G4 models with no IPU but later embedded processors were introduced instead

I/O
 PCI Express 4.0 (Pentium and Celeron CPUs are limited to PCI Express 3.0)
 Integrated Thunderbolt 4 (includes USB4)
 LPDDR4X-4267 memory support
 LPDDR5-5400 "architecture capability" (Intel expected Tiger Lake products with LPDDR5 to be available around Q1 2021 but never released them)
Miniaturization of CPU and motherboard into an M.2 SSD-sized small circuit board

Hardware telemetry 

 Add Intel Platform Monitoring Technology

List of Tiger Lake CPUs

Mobile processors (Tiger Lake-H) 
 All models support DDR4-3200 memory
 All models support 20 reconfigurable PCI Express 4.0 lanes, allowing x16 Gen 4 link for discrete GPU and x4 Gen 4 link for M.2 SSDs

Mobile processors (Tiger Lake-H35) 

 All models support DDR4-3200 or LPDDR4X-4267 memory

Mobile processors (UP3-class)

Embedded mobile processors (UP3-class)

Mobile processors (UP4-class)

 TDP: 7-15W
 Memory support: LPDDR4X-4267

Desktop processors (Tiger Lake-B) 

 Socket: FCBGA1787, a BGA socket, thus these CPUs are meant only for system integrators
Intel Xe UHD Graphics
 Up to 128 GB DDR4-3200 memory

See also
 Process-Architecture-Optimization model
 List of Intel CPU microarchitectures

References

Intel products
Intel microarchitectures
Transactional memory
X86 microarchitectures